Pressurisation duct work is a passive fire protection system. It is used to supply fresh air to any area of refuge, designated emergency evacuation or egress route.

Purpose
The purpose of pressurisation ductwork is to maintain positive pressure in building spaces to prevent smoke from entering from other spaces in which a fire is occurring. It is typically used in exit stairways, corridors, and lobbies.

Requirements
Pressurisation ductwork is certified on the basis of fire testing such as ISO 6944.

Systems
There are two means of providing fire-resistance rated ductwork:

Inherently fire-resistant, or proprietary factory assembled ducts which are made of sheet metal shells filled with mixtures of rockwool, fiber and silicon dioxide
Sheet metal duct with exterior fireproofing materials such as blanket rockwool, ceramic fiber, or in-tumescent paint.

See also
 Heat and smoke vent
 Fire protection
 Smoke exhaust ductwork
 Emergency evacuation

External links

ISO 6944-1:2008 Fire containment -- Elements of building construction -- Part 1: Ventilation ducts

Active fire protection
Pressure
Heating, ventilation, and air conditioning